Forest Knolls may refer to:

  Forest Knolls (New Rochelle), a neighborhood in New Rochelle, New York, US
 Forest Knolls, British Columbia, a neighbourhood in Langley Township, British Columbia, Canada
 Forest Knolls, Marin County, California, an unincorporated community in the US
 Forest Knolls, San Francisco, California, a neighborhood at the foot of Mount Sutro in the US
 "Forest Knolls", a track on John Vanderslice's 2009 album Romanian Names

See also
 Lagunitas-Forest Knolls, California, a census-designated place in the US